Brighton railway station is located on the Seaford line. Situated in the south-western Adelaide suburb of Brighton, it is 16 kilometres from Adelaide station.

History 

The original station was adjacent to Beach Road, 15.8 kilometres from Adelaide station, and opened on 24 November 1913 on the opening of the line from Goodwood.

A rebuilt station was opened on 25 January 1976, coinciding with the Seaford line's extension to Christie Downs.

Services by platform

References

External links

Flickr gallery

Railway stations in Adelaide
Railway stations in Australia opened in 1913